On 20 June 2015, Alen Rizvanović drove a sports utility vehicle at high speeds through the center of Graz, Austria, killing three people in a matter of minutes and injuring 36 others, some of them seriously. At one point during the attack, Rizvanović got out of the vehicle and stabbed passersby. He was later arrested by police.

Attack 
On 20 June 2015, a vehicular attack occurred at 12:15 p.m. in the center of the Austrian city of Graz. According to a spokesperson, the rampage started in Zweiglgasse, where one victim died. Rizvanović then drove through the city, passing over the Schönaugasse bridge and entering Herrengasse, where he killed two more people. He then crashed into a café seating area in the Hauptplatz (main square), where an event related to the 2015 Austrian Grand Prix was being held.

During his attack, Rizvanović jumped briefly out of his car, ran up to an elderly couple in front of a grocery shop, and stabbed them with a knife, wounding the man severely. He then drove to a police station at Schmiedgasse and was arrested by police without resistance. A witness compared the sounds of chairs and tables being knocked over by the vehicle to a "gunfight". The attack lasted for five minutes. Sixty ambulances and four helicopters were sent to transport injured victims to hospitals.

Victims 
Three people were immediately killed in the attack and a total of 36 others, including three children, were wounded, six of them seriously and one critically. All of the casualties were hit by Rizvanović's car, with the exception of a couple, who were stabbed by Rizvanović when he got out of the car.

Perpetrator 
Alen Rizvan Rizvanović, was 26-year-old when he carried out the attack. At the age of four he had fled along with his parents to Austria during the Bosnian War as a refugee and he later became an Austrian citizen. Rizvanović eventually found employment as a truck driver. He was under a restraining order filed on 28 May, which kept him away from the home of his wife and two young children following a domestic violence report being filed against him a month prior. As a result of the restraining order, police revoked Rizvanović's weapon's licence and confiscated a semiautomatic firearm and ammunition belonging to him.

The motive was not immediately clear, but a few hours after the attack, police ruled out any religious or ideological motives. When he was arrested, Rizvanović claimed that he felt persecuted by "Turks". On 23 June, a remand was imposed on him. The previous day, it was reported by Austrian newspaper Die Presse that the Federal Office for the Protection of the Constitution and Counterterrorism is "interested in Rizvanović". There are claims that Rizvanović had shifted to a stricter interpretation of Islam. Prior to the attack, he had more than 2,500 followers on Twitter, many of them from Arab countries and at least one a suspected neo-Nazi, but he deleted all of the tweets and messages on his online accounts, except for one, which indicated that the crime was premeditated and not the deed of a mentally ill person.

Conviction
Perpetrator was tried and convicted in 2016.

Reactions 

Austrian President Heinz Fischer issued a statement and said he was "deeply shocked" by the attack. Johanna Mikl-Leitner, the Austrian Interior Minister, said during a visit to the scene of the attack, "What happened here is unthinkable. There is no excuse for it." Styria governor Hermann Schützenhöfer issued a statement, saying, "We are shocked and dismayed...here is no explanation and no excuse for this attack." Graz mayor Siegfried Nagl, who witnessed the rampage unfold, ordered events in Graz to be canceled and black flags of mourning to be raised above municipal buildings.

References 

2015 in Austria
Attacks in Europe in 2015
2015 attack
Murders by motor vehicle
June 2015 crimes in Europe
June 2015 events in Europe
Vehicular rampage in Europe
2015 murders in Austria